Emigration from Moldova is a mass phenomenon, having a significant impact on the country's demographics and economy.

Overview 
Confronted with economic instability, collapsing incomes, and rapidly rising unemployment that accompanied the fall of the Soviet Union, people began emigrating from Moldova on a large scale in the first half of the 1990s. The Information and Security Service of the Republic of Moldova has estimated that 1,200,000 to 2,000,000 Moldovan citizens (almost 45% of a population of some 3.6 million) are working abroad. Russia (especially the Moscow region), Italy, Ukraine, Romania, France, Portugal, Spain, Greece, Turkey, and Israel are the main destinations. Due to the clandestine nature of these migration flows, however, no official statistics exist. Some 500,000 Moldovans are thought to be working in Russia, mainly in construction. Another estimate puts the number of Moldovans in Italy at 500,000. Moldovan citizens are drawn toward countries that speak their language or a similar one, such as Romanians to Romance-speaking countries, Russians and Ukrainians to Russia or Ukraine, or the Turkic-speaking Gagauz to Turkey.

Remittances from Moldovans abroad account for almost 16,1% of Moldova's GDP, the twelfth-highest percentage in the world.

See also

Moldovan diaspora
Euro-orphans

References

External links
 Moldova hit by mass emigration 
 Moldova: Emigration Creating Hardships At Home

Demographics of Moldova
Emigration